John Mackie may refer to:

John C. Mackie (1920–2008), U.S. Representative from Michigan
John Duncan Mackie (1887–1978), Scottish historian
J. L. Mackie (1917–1981), Australian-born philosopher, best known for his views on meta-ethics
John Mackie, Baron John-Mackie (1909–1994), British Labour Member of Parliament 1959–1974
John Mackie (Scottish Unionist politician) (1898–1958), Scottish Unionist Member of Parliament for Galloway 1931–1958
John F. Mackie (1835–1910), first United States Marine to receive the Medal of Honor
John Milton Mackie (1813–1894), American writer
John Mackie (Kirkcudbright MP) (died 1858), MP for Kirkcudbright Stewartry
John Mackie (born 1961), bassist for Scottish post-punk band Scars

Association football
Alec Mackie (John Alexander Mackie, 1903–1984), Irish professional footballer who played for Arsenal, Portsmouth and Northampton Town
John Mackie (footballer, born 1910) (1910–1980), Scottish professional footballer who played for Hull City, Bradford City and Chesterfield
John Mackie (footballer, born 1976), English professional footballer who played for Reading and Leyton Orient

See also
Jack McKay (disambiguation)
John MacKay (disambiguation)
John Mackey (disambiguation)
John McKay (disambiguation)